The Lords of Flatbush is the second mixtape by American hip hop duo The Underachievers. It was released on August 29, 2013 by Elevated Nations and Brainfeeder, it was distributed by RPM MSC. The mixtape features production by Lex Luger, Eff Dope and Erick Arc Elliott.

Title
The Underachievers pay homage to a Brooklyn 1974 film of the same name about the coming of age of four young men in 1958. The EP grabs influence from the movie, known for its racy scenes about stealing cars and bar fights, capturing a similar relentless, youthful energy.

Track listing

References

External links
 Credits and label information adapted from: Shopify

2013 mixtape albums
The Underachievers albums